James Bulloch may refer to:
James Dunwoody Bulloch (1823–1901), Confederate chief foreign agent in Great Britain
James Stephens Bulloch (1793–1849), Georgia settler, planter and father of James Dunwoody Bulloch
James Bulloch (footballer) (1909–?), Scottish footballer

See also
Jimmy Bullock (1902–1977), former English footballer